Victa Westlink Rail was a railway company based at Derby, United Kingdom. The company was formed in December 2006 following the liquidation of FM Rail. It has since been absorbed by Stobart Rail.

Victa is a well-known name in the rail industry and has been running cargo trains between Hams Hall and Mossend since November 2006. Westlink is part of Stobart Group Ltd, which was created in September 2007 following a merger between Westbury Property Fund and Eddie Stobart.

Its stated aim is to run multi-customer trains to attract companies to rail that traditionally have not been able to afford it.

The railway company was running a summer service between Bristol and Minehead (on the West Somerset Railway) in 2007, using stock hired from Mainline Rail, thus enjoying the distinction of being the only TOC to run timetabled passenger trains on and off a preserved steam railway.

The company is also involved in the rail tour business through Hertfordshire Rail Tours which was acquired from the failed FM Rail.

Following the merger between Westbury Property Fund and Eddie Stobart, the business was further enhanced by the acquisition of the O'Conner Group by Westlink. O'Conner owns the Widnes Intermodal Rail Depot, a rail terminal connected to the UK's rail network via the West Coast Main Line and lying adjacent to the former AHC warehousing site acquired by Westbury in March 2007.

Westbury also owns the port of Weston in Runcorn.

Fleet details

Transport operators of the United Kingdom